Arawa may refer to:
 Arawa (canoe), one of the Māori canoes that brought Polynesian migrants to New Zealand
 Te Arawa, a confederation of Māori tribes in New Zealand
 Arawa, Papua New Guinea, former capital city of Bougainville province in Papua New Guinea
 Arawa Rural LLG, a local-level government area of Bougainville province in Papua New Guinea
 Arawa language (extinct) belonging to the Arawan languages